The 1970 Stockholm Open was a men's tennis tournament played on indoor hard courts and part of the 1970 Pepsi-Cola Grand Prix and took place at the Kungliga tennishallen in Stockholm, Sweden. The tournament was held from 1 November through 7 November 1970. Stan Smith won the singles title.

Finals

Singles

 Stan Smith defeated  Arthur Ashe, 5–7, 6–4, 6–4

Doubles

 Arthur Ashe /  Stan Smith defeated  Bob Carmichael /  Owen Davidson, 6–0, 5–7, 7–5

References

External links
  
  
 Association of Tennis Professionals (ATP) tournament profile
 ITF Tournament Details

Stockholm Open
Stockholm Open
Stock
November 1970 sports events in Europe
1970s in Stockholm